This is a list of the hamlets in Lewis County, New York.

References

Populated places in Lewis County, New York
Hamlets in New York (state)